Ivankovo is a rural locality (a village) in Beketovskoye Rural Settlement, Vozhegodsky District, Vologda Oblast, Russia. The population was 22 as of 2002.

Geography 
Ivankovo is located 69 km southwest of Vozhega (the district's administrative centre) by road. Borisovo is the nearest rural locality.

References 

Rural localities in Vozhegodsky District